Heike Makatsch (born 13 August 1971) is a German actress. She is known for her roles as Lisa Addison in Resident Evil (2002), Mia in Love Actually (2003), and as Liesel's mother in The Book Thief (2013).

Early life
Makatsch was born in Düsseldorf, West Germany, the daughter of former German national ice hockey team goaltender Rainer Makatsch. She spent several months in New Mexico in 1988 in an effort to improve her English, and later studied politics and sociology at the University of Düsseldorf for four semesters, which was followed by an apprenticeship as a dressmaker until 1994.

Career

Makatsch's television career started in 1993, when she was hired by music channel VIVA, hosting shows such as Interaktiv and Heikes Hausbesuche; two years later, on 13 August 1995, she became the host of the German chart show Bravo TV, aired by RTL II, a position she kept until summer 1996. In 1997, she started hosting her own weekly, late night show titled Heike Makatsch Show. However, due to bad ratings, it was canceled after only eight episodes.

Makatsch first appeared in a film in 1996 when she starred in Detlev Buck's Männerpension (English: "Jailbirds"). She received the Bavarian Film Award as the most talented young actor for her performance. Since then, she has appeared in several German and English language productions including the romantic comedy Love Actually (2003). She is perhaps best known for her role as Lisa Addison, Matt's sister in the video game-based sci-fi/horror film Resident Evil (2002).

She voiced Terk in the German dub of Disney's Tarzan.

Since 2012, Makatsch has been a face for French cosmetics company L'Oréal.

Makatsch served on the jury of the Goldene Kamera awards in 2017.

Personal life
Makatsch was in a seven-year relationship with British actor Daniel Craig, ending in 2004.

She has three daughters, born in 2007, 2009, and 2015; the first two are with musician Max Martin Schröder, from the German indie band Tomte. She has been in a relationship with actor Trystan Pütter since 2017.

, Makatsch lives in Berlin.

Awards and nominations
In 1995, Makatsch won the Bavarian Film Award for Best New Actress for her role in Männerpension. In 2003, she and the rest of the cast of Love Actually were nominated for the Phoenix Film Critics Society Award for Best Cast. She was nominated in 2006 for an International Emmy Award for Best Actress for her role in Margarete Steiff – A Story of Courage.

Selected filmography

Discography

Albums
 1997: Obsession - soundtrack for Obsession
 2005: Almost Heaven - soundtrack for Almost Heaven
 2009: Hilde - soundtrack for Hilde
 2009: Die schönsten Kinderlieder, with Max Schröder

Singles
 1996: Stand by Your Man, as Heike & Dirk - from soundtrack for Männerpension
 1997: This Girl Was Made for Loving - from soundtrack for Obsession
 1999: 50 Ways to Leave Your Lover - from soundtrack for Die Häupter meiner Lieben

References

External links

 
 
 filmstar.de entry for Heike Makatsch 

1971 births
German film actresses
Living people
Actors from Düsseldorf
German television actresses
20th-century German actresses
21st-century German actresses
International Emmy Award for Best Actress winners
21st-century German women singers